Incarnation of Money is a 2013 South Korean television series about greed, ambition, and love. Starring Kang Ji-hwan, Park Sang-min, Hwang Jung-eum, Oh Yoon-ah, Choi Yeo-jin and Kim Soo-mi, it aired on SBS from February 2 to April 21, 2013 on Saturdays and Sundays at 22:00 for 24 episodes.

Plot
Lee Cha-don grew up in an orphanage and became a prosecutor, one of the most respected professions in Korea. But, as it turns out, it also can be one of the most corrupt professions, with plenty of opportunities to shake down gamblers and pocket some extra cash. With no memories of his past, Cha-don's fate is inextricably tied with Bok Jae-in, the daughter of a loan shark who funded Cha-don's upbringing and education and wants to be repaid for the investment. Ji Se-kwang, a senior prosecutor, is responsible for the trajectory of Cha-don's life, pretends to be a righteous prosecutor while hiding the misdeeds of his past.

In 1998, a wealthy businessman, Lee Joong Man was killed by Ji Se-kwang, and all his property goes to his mistress Eun Bi Riyeong (later: Angelina). Lee Joong Man's wife, Park Gi Soo was accused for that murder, and sentenced to prison. After Park Gi Soo was imprisoned, Lee Joong Man's son, Lee Kang Seok(later: Lee Cha Don) having nowhere to go, went to Ji Se-kwang' apartment, and discovered that Ji Se-kwang was having affair with Eun Bi Riyeong,  both had conspiracy for the murder of Lee Joong Man. Lee Kang Seok tried to tell the lawyer and a reporter, who was involved in his murder case, but both of them were bribed by Ji Se-kwang and stayed silent. Ji Se-kwang, in order to cover all the crime he had created, tried to kill Lee Kang Seok. Lee Kang Seok while running away from Ji Se-kwang, was hit by a car, and lost his memory. The person who hit him, Madam Bok Hwa Sool, funded Lee Kang Seok' study, and wished that he becomes a prosecutor.

Ji Se-kwang, who killed Lee Joong Man, and plotted the whole murder, lives as a respected, righteous prosecutor. Lee Joong Man's mistress Eun Bi Riyeong, went to USA after the murder case is closed. Both the lawyer and the reporter lived successfully and became famous people in Korea.

Later in 2013, when Lee Kang Seok/Lee Cha Don worked as prosecutor, he learned about his past, and tried to take revenge on the five people (Ji Se-kwang, Eun Bi Riyeong/Angelina, the lawyer(Prosecutor Kwon Jae-gyu), the reporter(Reporter Go) and Lee Joong Man's lawyer (Hwang Jang Shik).

Cast
Main characters
Kang Ji-hwan - Lee Cha-don/ Lee Kang-seok 
Park Ji-bin - young Kang-seok
Park Sang-min - Ji Se-kwang
Hwang Jung-eum - Bok Jae-in 
Seo Shin-ae - young Jae-in
Oh Yoon-ah - Eun Bi-ryung
Choi Yeo-jin - Jeon Ji-hoo
Kim Soo-mi - Bok Hwa-sool

Supporting characters
Park Soon-chun - Park Ki-soon, Kang-seok's mother
Lee Ki-young - Kwon Jae-kyu
Jung Eun-pyo - Hwang Jang-shik
Lee Seung-hyung - Go Ho
Yang Hyung-wook - Yang Goo-shik
Kim Hak-chul - Jung Hae-ryong
Choi Jin-ho - Lee Kwan-soo
Do Ji-han - Kwon Hyuk
Lee Byung-joon - Jo Sang-deuk
Yoon Yong-hyun - Kim Pal-do
Joo Hyun - Lee Joong-man, Kang-seok's father
Lee Ji-hyun - Hong Ja-mong
Go In-beom - Kang-seok's uncle
Seo Dong-kyun - Secretary Seo
Son Byong-ho
 Jo Woo-jin

Guest appearances
Song Kyung-chul - Gentleman of Jingogae, Jae-in's father/Hwa-sool's ex-husband
Noh Hyung-wook - Jae-in's math tutor (ep 3)
Lee Han-wi - plastic surgeon (ep 5)
Lee Moon-sik - Park So-tae (ep 9)
Kim Byeong-ok - nursing home director (ep 11)
Choi Jong-ryul - Ji Man-ho, Se-kwang's father (ep 15)
Kim Kwang-in - Yellow Sea Credit Union's major stakeholder
Maeng Bong-hak - Yellow Sea Credit Union's major stakeholder
Choi Sang-hoon - Jeon Hoon, Ji-hoo's father

Ratings

Awards and nominations

References

External links
  
 
 

2013 South Korean television series debuts
2013 South Korean television series endings
Seoul Broadcasting System television dramas
Korean-language television shows
Television series about prosecutors
Television shows written by Jang Young-chul
South Korean crime television series
Television series by JS Pictures